Rory Kavanagh (born 23 August 1982) is an Irish Gaelic football manager and former player with St Eunan's and the Donegal county team. He currently manages the St Eunan's club.

Alongside Colm McFadden and Christy Toye, he would have been considered one of the experienced members of the Donegal senior football panel in his final days. Kavanagh's haul of Ulster Senior Football Championships was a joint county team record (alongside such past players as Anthony Molloy, Martin McHugh, Joyce McMullan and Donal Reid) for four years until Patrick McBrearty, Neil McGee, Paddy McGrath, Leo McLoone, Frank McGlynn, Michael Murphy and Anthony Thompson surpassed it in 2018.

Early life
Kavanagh is from Letterkenny. His father Charlie also played Gaelic football.

Kavanagh attended Scoil Colmcille and St Eunan's College in Letterkenny. He played in the St Eunan's College team that won the McLarnon Cup for a third time in 2000, their first win since 1979.

Playing career

Club
Kavanagh won six Donegal Senior Football Championships with the St Eunan's club. He made his senior debut in 2000 when he was 18 years of age.

He made a substitute appearance for the club in the 2020 Donegal Senior Football Championship semi-final loss to Naomh Conaill and was substituted himself before the end.

He also played for Donegal Boston.

Inter-county
Mickey Moran first called up Kavanagh for the Donegal senior panel in 2001. 

Against Armagh in the 2004 Ulster final at Croke Park, he came on as a substitute for the injured Christy Toye. Against the same opponents at the same venue he played in the 2006 Ulster final, scoring 0–1. Having spent much of the campaign on the bench, he came on as a substitute in the 2007 NFL Final against Mayo, scoring 0–1.

On 19 December 2008, he was named captain for the 2009 season.

Kavanagh went travelling abroad and only returned over Easter in 2010 but was sprung from the bench directly into the 2010 National Football League game against Armagh at O'Donnell Park shortly afterwards, having been sent off in his first game back for St Eunan's.

He made his 100th appearance for his county in the 2012 Ulster Senior Football Championship preliminary round match against Cavan and captained the team in the absence of the injured Michael Murphy.

Again against Mayo, this time under the management of Jim McGuinness, Kavanagh started at midfield in the 2012 All-Ireland Senior Football Championship Final. Speaking to BBC Radio Foyle from his team hotel in Dublin the following morning, he was still hoarse himself and described the win as "surreal". He was nominated to be an All Star in 2012, but missed out due to bad luck, according to many experts. He won consecutive Ulster Senior Football Championships in 2011 and 2012. Against Derry in the 2011 Ulster SFC final, he was injured late in the first half and was replaced by Martin McElhinney.

He won his third and final Ulster SFC in 2014, appearing as a substitute for Christy Toye in the final against Monaghan.

Kavanagh decided to retire from the county set up at the end of 2014. In 2016, he unretired himself and returned to the Donegal panel. In January 2017, Kavanagh finally retired from the inter-county game. It later emerged that much of this apparent indecisiveness was influenced by Rory Gallagher (McGuinness's assistant and, later, Donegal manager), who would lay in wait at Kavanagh's house and approach him as he returned home from school in efforts to attract him (both Rorys also bear a passing resemblance to each other).

Training regime
Until Jim McGuinness took over as team manager, Kavanagh was a frail and delicate sort of figure. McGuinness requested that he eat eight meals each day. McGuinness requested his consumption be in the form of an early breakfast, followed by lunch at 10.30, more food at 12:30, followed by more food at 3.00, more food at 6.00 and more food at 9.00. McGuinness also expected Kavanagh to eat half a tub of ice-cream if the player was not in satisfactory condition.

Media career
Kavanagh is a pundit on eir Sport.

He has also appeared on The Sunday Game on RTÉ.

Management career
Kavanagh managed Donegal to the 2018 Buncrana Cup.

In December 2019, Kavanagh was unveiled as manager of the Donegal Under-15 Academy Squad.

In November 2020, Kavanagh was appointed manager of the St Eunan's senior team. He led the club to a first Donegal SFC in seven years in his first season as manager, defeating favourites Naomh Conaill in the final.

Personal life
Kavanagh is a married man. He mentioned his wife on BBC Radio after winning the Sam Maguire Cup, explaining that the noise in the background was the sound of her snoring.

He teaches at his old primary school in Letterkenny.

Honours

Player
Donegal
 All-Ireland Senior Football Championship: 2012
 Ulster Senior Football Championship: 2011, 2012, 2014
 National Football League: 2007
 National Football League, Division 2: 2011
 Dr McKenna Cup: 2009

St Eunan's
 Donegal Senior Football Championship: 2001, 2007, 2008, 2009, 2012, 2014

Donegal Boston
 North-East Men's Senior Football Championship: 2015

Ulster
 Railway Cup: 2012

Individual
 All Star nomination: 2012

Manager
St Eunan's
 Donegal Senior Football Championship: 2021

References

External links

 Official profile
 Rory Kavanagh at gaainfo.com

1982 births
Living people
Donegal Boston Gaelic footballers
Donegal inter-county Gaelic footballers
Gaelic football managers
Gaelic games writers and broadcasters
Irish expatriate sportspeople in the United States
Irish schoolteachers
People educated at St Eunan's College
People from Letterkenny
St Eunan's Gaelic footballers
Winners of one All-Ireland medal (Gaelic football)